USS Direct (AM-430/MSO-430) was an  of the United States Navy. Laid down on 2 February 1952 at the Hiltebrant Dry Dock Co., of Kingston, New York, the ship was launched on 27 May 1953; commissioned on 9 July 1954 by Benjamin H. Dean; and reclassified as an Ocean Minesweeper, MSO-430, 7 February 1955.

North Atlantic operations
Based at Charleston, South Carolina, Direct operated on mine-sweeping exercises and training with other ships. She also provided services to the Fleet Sonar School at Key West, Naval Mine Defense Laboratory at Panama City, Florida, and Mine Warfare School at Yorktown, Virginia.

From 1 May to 2 October 1957 she cruised to the Mediterranean Sea for duty with the United States Sixth Fleet. On 14 April 1958 her home port was changed to Yorktown, Virginia, and on 15 January 1959 to Little Creek, Virginia. Between 27 April and 27 August 1959 she served again in the Mediterranean, then served in amphibious exercises and other operations through 1962.

Decommissioning 

References

External links
 

 

Agile-class minesweepers
Ships built in Kingston, New York
1953 ships
Cold War minesweepers of the United States